Samasrayana or Pancha Samskara (meaning Five Purifications) is a Pañcaratra rite practiced in all forms of Vaishnavism. Samasrayana means 'to approach with all sincerity and truthfulness to Acharya'. During this rite, the acharya initiates a person, irrespective of sex, caste, social status etc., as his or her sishya. It is a commitment from the disciple that he or she will live as per the wishes of the acharya. Thus, the person gets the link to the Vaishnava tradition.

Samasrayana consists of the guru bringing the initiate into the srivaishnava flock through five steps: (1) thapaha-embossing the impression of Vishnu's sudarshana discus on the right shoulder of the initiate and of Vishnu's panchajanya conch on the left shoulder of the initiate - using an ember-heated silver seal; (2)pundraha-introducing the twelve locations in the body where Vishnu resides and thus are to be marked with the Vaishnava tilak sign; (3)dasaha tatha namaha-adding the suffix dasan (servant - of Vishnu and Ramanuja) to the initiate's name; (4)mantraha- teaching the Vaishnava mantram; (5) aradhana-initiating the disciple in the proper form of the ritual worship of Vishnu.

Males undergo the samasrayana ritual soon after their upanayana (sacred thread) ceremony or after their wedding - this varies depending on which subsect of srivaishnavism one belongs to. Females typically undergo this soon after their wedding.

References

External links
 http://www.saranagathi.org/articles/samasrayanam.htm
 http://www.ahobilamutt.org/us/library/samaasrayanam.pdf

Vaishnavism
Hindu philosophical concepts